Newzbin was a British Usenet indexing website, intended to facilitate access to content on Usenet. The site caused controversy over its stance on copyrighted material. Access to the Newzbin.com website was blocked by BT and Sky in late 2011, following legal action in the UK by Hollywood film studios.

The site announced  that it had closed down on 28 November 2012.

Features
Newzbin indexed binary files that had been posted on Usenet, and offered the results through a search engine, with categories that included "Movies", "Music", "Apps" and "Books". The site created NZB files, which allowed the files to be downloaded with a suitable newsreader. NZB files are similar to torrent files, as they do not contain the file itself, but information about the location of the file to be downloaded. The search results could be browsed free of charge after creating a user account, but access to the NZB files was restricted to premium members who paid a subscription.

2010 legal action from Hollywood studios
In February and March 2010, Twentieth Century Fox Film Corporation, Universal City Studios Productions LLLP, Warner Bros. Entertainment Inc., Paramount Pictures Corporation, Disney Enterprises, Inc. and Columbia Pictures Industries, Inc. took joint legal action against Newzbin in the High Court in London, arguing that the site was encouraging widespread copyright infringement by indexing unofficial copies of films on Usenet.

In March 2010, Mr. Justice Kitchin ruled that Newzbin was deliberately indexing copyrighted content, observing that Newzbin had a "sophisticated and substantial infrastructure and in the region of 700,000 members, though not all premium", and that "for the year ended 31 December 2009, it had a turnover in excess of £1million, a profit in excess of £360,000 and paid dividends on ordinary shares of £415,000". Chris Elsworth, the main operator of Newzbin, had said repeatedly during the case that he had no knowledge of infringement occurring on the service, and that Newzbin's categories for "CAM," "screener," "telesync," "DVD", "R5 retail", "Blu-ray," and "HD DVD" did not suggest any evidence of infringement. Kitchin was critical of Elsworth, stating that his evidence disputing the claim that the site's features did not encourage copyright infringement was "simply not credible".

On 18 May 2010, the Newzbin.com site was temporarily shut down, displaying the message "Regrettably the Newzbin website has to close as a result of the legal action against us."

By 2 June 2010, Newzbin was back online, under the name Newzbin2, but using the same code and database as its predecessor, and hosted in the Seychelles.

2011 legal action and ISP site blocking
In June 2011, the Motion Picture Association applied for an injunction to force BT, the largest Internet service provider in the United Kingdom, to cut off customers' access to Newzbin. On 28 July 2011, the High Court ruled that BT had to block access to Newzbin, using Cleanfeed. BT announced that it would not appeal against the ruling. The Open Rights Group was critical of the decision, saying that it could set a "dangerous" precedent.

In September 2011, Newzbin released client software which aimed to circumvent the BT blocking.

On 26 October 2011 at the High Court, Mr. Justice Arnold ordered BT to block its estimated six million customers' access to the website Newzbin2 within fourteen days, the first ruling of its kind under UK copyright law. Attempts to access the site from a BT IP address were met by the message "Error - site blocked". Newzbin claimed that the block was ineffective, and that 93.5% of its active UK users had downloaded its workaround software. A study suggested that the workaround involved encryption to hide communication between users and Newzbin2, including the use of the Tor network.

Sky blocked access to Newzbin, stating: "We have received a court order requiring us to block access to this illegal website, which we did on 13th December, 2011."

2012
On 26 January 2012, barrister David Harris, who had represented Newzbin during part of the 2010 High Court case, was disbarred after it emerged that 100% of the site's issued share capital was held in his name. He was also fined £2,500 after tweeting as "@Geeklawyer", describing opposing lawyers with the words "slimebags" and "prick".

In February 2012, the Newzbin.com domain closed down, and the site moved to Newzbin2.es.

On 13 August 2012, Virgin Media blocked access to the site.

Closedown
On 28 November 2012, Newzbin2.es announced the closure of its indexing service, displaying to visitors the following text on its main page:

December 2012 court action against former Newzbin directors

On 20 December 2012 at the High Court in London, Mr Justice Newey ruled that the film studios involved in the legal action against Newzbin did not have a proprietary claim to money derived from infringement of copyright. The studios had taken action against David Harris and Chris Elsworth, two of the former directors of the company.

See also
Comparison of Usenet newsreaders
Digital Economy Act 2010
Grokster

References

Usenet
United Kingdom copyright law
Copyright law
Copyright legislation
Computer law
2011 in law
Internet in the United Kingdom
Copyright infringement
Internet services shut down by a legal challenge